Benson Knob is a distinctive rocky hill,  high, at the south extremity of Ricker Hills in the Prince Albert Mountains, Victoria Land. It was mapped by the United States Geological Survey from surveys and from U.S. Navy air photos, 1956–62, and named by the Advisory Committee on Antarctic Names for Anthony J. Benson, hospital corpsman with the South Pole Station winter party, 1966.

References
 

Hills of Oates Land